Klaramaria Skala (1921-2006) was an Austrian stage and film actress. She appeared in the 1947 historical musical film It's Only Love.

Selected filmography
 Vienna Blood (1942)
 Late Love (1943)
 It's Only Love (1947)
 A Heart Beats for You (1949)
 Hot Pavements of Cologne (1967)

References

Bibliography 
 Mitchell, Charles P.  The Great Composers Portrayed on Film, 1913 Through 2002. McFarland & Company, 2004.

External links 
 

1921 births
2006 deaths
Austrian film actresses
Actresses from Vienna